The Fugitive is a 1947 drama film starring Henry Fonda and directed by John Ford, based on the 1940 novel The Power and the Glory by Graham Greene. The film was shot on location in Mexico.

Plot
A nameless and conflicted Catholic priest is a fugitive in an unnamed Latin American state where religion is outlawed. He tries to escape the country but his efforts are thwarted by a crazy Native and other circumstances. He returns to his village. Another fugitive, a murderous North American bandit dubbed "El Gringo", has already arrived in town. The crazy Native and the police troops soon follow. While Maria Dolores- a beautiful Indian woman, entertains the men, the priest escapes from the back. As the priest escapes the bandit "El Gringo" holds off the troops in a gun battle. He ends up wounded. The priest and Maria Dolores escape. In another town the priest seeks sanctuary but the crazy Native tracks him down and tells him that "El Gringo" is dying and he must return to give him last rites. He is dying but refuses the confession. Of course, it was a trap by the crazy Native and the head lieutenant, who has been hunting him. The priest is captured and sentenced to death, but forgives the informant for betraying him. The priest's execution by firing squad brings an outpouring of public grief and shows the authorities that it is impossible to stamp out religion as long as it exists in people's hearts and minds. Even the police lieutenant acknowledges his own faith.  In a church several residents pray for peace when there is a knock at the door.  A man stands at the door announcing that he is the new priest for the village.

Cast
 Henry Fonda as Fugitive priest
 Dolores del Río as Maria Dolores 
 Pedro Armendáriz as Police lieutenant
 J. Carrol Naish as Police informer
 Leo Carrillo as Chief of police
 Ward Bond as James "El Gringo" Calvary
 Robert Armstrong as Police sergeant
 Rodolfo Acosta as Policeman (uncredited)
 Mel Ferrer as Father Serra (uncredited)

Production 
An international co-production between The United States and Mexico. The Fugitive was filmed on location in Taxco de Alarcón, Cholula, Cuernavaca, and the Churubusco Studios in Mexico City.  It was the first collaboration between RKO and Ford-Cooper's company Argosy Pictures, the deal was for Argosy to produce three pictures that RKO should distribute and they would share the costs, and benefits fifty-fifty, but retaining creative control.

With the exception of two assistant directors and an editor, the entire crew was Mexican, about it Ford said it ran ""neck and neck with the best...in Hollywood."

John Ford was helped by Mexican director Emilio Fernández who served as an associate producer of the film. He introduced Ford to Dolores del Río, Pedro Armendáriz and cinematographer Gabriel Figueroa (all people Fernández previously worked with). About Figueroa's work Ford said: "It had a lot of damn good photography – with those black and white shadows, [...] We had a good cameraman, Gabriel Figueroa, and we'd wait for the light – instead of the way it is nowadays, where regardless of the light, you shoot."

Reception
Tag Gallagher has written an extended discussion of the film in his book, John Ford: The Man and His Films (1986). He summarizes The Fugitive and its place in Ford's career as follows: "once in Mexico, Ford jettisoned most of the script and, giving leave to his fancy, made a highly abstract art film. The Fugitive lost considerable money, caused a rift between [writer Dudley] Nichols and Ford, and has posed problems even for Ford's most devoted followers. Only the director himself consistently defended it. 'I just enjoy looking at it.' 'To me, it was perfect.' And in terms of composition, lighting and editing, The Fugitive may be among the most enjoyable pictures."

Bret Wood has written, "Ford is best remembered today for his boisterous adventure films, such as The Quiet Man (1952), The Searchers (1956) or She Wore a Yellow Ribbon (1949); and for his crusty, unpretentious demeanor, often denying the existence of thematic subtext in his work and refusing to discuss his artistic intentions as a director. But The Fugitive belongs to an earlier, lesser known faction of his work, self-consciously 'arty' films that demonstrated his interests in German expressionism, English literature and religious ideology. Films such as The Informer (1935), The Prisoner of Shark Island (1936) or The Long Voyage Home (1940), remind us that beneath Ford's growling machismo were a sophisticated mind and a brilliant visual sense, even though Ford was later to deny both gifts ('I make Westerns' is how he typically summarized his career). The Fugitive is perhaps Ford's last great 'art film', a high-minded show of faith, a lovingly crafted paean to his own Catholicism."

Accolades
The film gained the prize of the International Catholic Organization for Cinema (OCIC) at the  Venice Film Festival in 1948. According to this jury, this was a film "most capable of contributing to the revival of moral and spiritual values of humanity". OCIC critic Johanes added to this that The Fugitive "excelled in plastic perfection. On the other hand, its very excess of pictorial splendour was a fault of the John Ford-Figueroa production; The drama of the priest as related by Graham Greene lost in profundity what it gained in external splendour". "We all know the definition of this award "for the production that has made the greatest contribution to the moral and spiritual betterment of humanity". it differs from the other awards, when are normally given for artistic merit. Art for Art's sake is not the object, but rather art for the sake of man, the whole of man, heart and soul. Pious dullness is not the aim (...).

See also
 List of American films of 1947

References

External links
 
 
 
 

1947 films
1947 drama films
Mexican drama films
Films about Mexican Americans
Mexican black-and-white films
1940s English-language films
English-language Mexican films
Films about Catholic priests
Films based on British novels
Films based on works by Graham Greene
Films set in Mexico
Films shot in Mexico
Estudios Churubusco films
RKO Pictures films
Films directed by John Ford
Films with screenplays by Dudley Nichols
Hispanic and Latino American drama films
1940s American films
1940s Mexican films